Sandra F. Simmons is an American clinical psychologist and gerontologist. She is the Joe C. Davis Endowed Chair in Biomedical Science at Vanderbilt University and the director of the Vanderbilt Center for Quality Aging.

Early life and education
Simmons earned her Bachelor of Arts and Master's degree from Middle Tennessee State University before receiving her PhD from Pennsylvania State University.

Career
Upon earning her PhD, Simmons worked as an Associate professor of Medicine at the University of California, Los Angeles Division of Geriatrics, Borun Center for Gerontological Research. She stayed there until 2006, when she joined the faculty at Vanderbilt University. That same year, she published Feeding Assistance Needs of Long‐Stay Nursing Home Residents and Staff Time to Provide Care with John F. Schnelle.

At Vanderbilt, Simmons worked at the Vanderbilt Center for Quality Aging alongside Schnelle "using evidence-based research to inform programming for memory-impaired residents." She later spent time researching the effectiveness of reduced medication intake on elderly patients. Simmons was eventually promoted to interim Director of the Vanderbilt Center for Quality Aging and Deputy Assistant Director of Research at the Geriatric Research, Education and Clinical Center. While serving in these roles on September 16, 2019, Simmons was appointed the Joe C. Davis Endowed Chair in Biomedical Science at Vanderbilt University.

References

External links
	

Living people
Year of birth missing (living people)
American gerontologists
American clinical psychologists
Vanderbilt University faculty
David Geffen School of Medicine at UCLA faculty
Middle Tennessee State University alumni
Pennsylvania State University alumni